Antonio Ferramolino was a 16th-century Italian architect and military engineer. He is also known as Sferrandino da Bergamo, and is called Hernan Molin in Spanish sources. He is mostly known for his work in Sicily, but he also designed fortifications in Ragusa and Malta.

Life
Ferramolino was born in Bergamo, which was then part of the Republic of Venice. He began his career as a soldier, but little is known about his early works. In 1529 he oversaw the construction of artillery at the Venetian Arsenal.

In 1532, he fought against the Ottomans in Hungary. Ferramolino was also present at the conquest of Tunis in 1535. In 1536, Emperor Charles V sent him to review the fortifications of Messina and the rest of Sicily. Over the next couple of years, he designed several fortifications around Sicily, including at Messina, Palermo and Catania.

In 1538, Ferramolino went to the Republic of Ragusa (modern Dubrovnik, Croatia) and designed the Revelin Fortress.

In 1540, he was sent to Malta, which was ruled by the Order of Saint John. He designed the cavalier and ditch of Fort St. Angelo, and designed two bastions of the fortifications of Mdina. He also proposed the construction of a fort on the Sciberras Peninsula.

Ferramolino was killed on 18 August 1550 during the siege of Mahdia in modern Tunisia.

Works

Ferramolino designed or modified the following fortifications, among others:
Forte Gonzaga, Messina, Sicily
Forte del Santissimo Salvatore, Messina, Sicily
Castello Matagrifone, Messina, Sicily
Fortifications of Palermo, Sicily
Fortifications of Catania, Sicily
Castello di Milazzo, Milazzo, Sicily
Revelin Fortress, Dubrovnik, Croatia
Modifications to the fortifications of Mdina, Malta
Cavalier and ditch of Fort St. Angelo, Birgu, Malta

References

1550 deaths
16th-century Italian architects
Italian military engineers
People from Bergamo